Star Wars is a 1992 pinball machine released by Data East. It is based on the Star Wars original trilogy of films.

A semi-official update, tweaking and refining the gameplay rules was released 20 years later.

References

External links 
 IPDB entry for Star Wars.
 Recent Auction Results for Star Wars

1992 pinball machines
Pinball machines based on films
Star Wars pinball machines
Data East pinball machines